Robert Jeremy Clayton Mansfield (15 August 1963 – 31 October 2022) was a South African radio and television personality. He worked on numerous radio stations as a presenter and voice-over artist, and also presented numerous television shows and inserts for popular television magazine programs.

Early life
Mansfield was born in Grahamstown, South Africa. He attended school at  Kingswood College. He remained in Grahamstown attending Rhodes University, where he studied Speech, Drama and Journalism.

Media career

Radio
In 1985, while still a student, he started working for the Durban-based radio station Capital Radio 604. During the same year, he was awarded the AA Vita Award as The Most Promising Young South African Actor. In 1990, Mansfield left Capital Radio (then broadcasting from Johannesburg). He was recruited to work for Super Sport on M-Net and was requested to do sport on the John Berks show on the Primedia-owned 702 Talk Radio.

Mansfield's popularity continued to grow, and in 1993, he was appointed as a regular presenter of 702's Saturday Afternoon magazine program. In 1995, Mansfield took over hosting of the afternoon show.

In 1997, Mansfield moved to 702 Talk Radio'''s sister station 94.7 Highveld Stereo where he created and hosted the weekday breakfast show, The Rude Awakening with Harry Sideropoulos, Sam Cowan, Paul Rotherham and Darren Simpson. In 2009, he was diagnosed with chronic lymphocytic leukaemia and received nine months of medical treatment. In June 2010, Mansfield announced he would be leaving the show. He hosted his last show on Monday 12 July 2010.

Jeremy Mansfield returned to radio in November 2018 as the host of the breakfast show, "Mansfield in the Morning", on community radio station, Hot 91.9fm.

Television and film

In the mid-1990s, Mansfield started appearing as a features contributor and guest presenter on South African Pay television channels M-Net for Front Row and SuperSport. In 1998 he left the channel and started presenting A Word or 2, on SABC 2. The show ran for 10 seasons.

In 2005, Mansfield co-presented the M-Net comedy show Laugh Out Loud. The show continued into a second season (airing in 2006).

In 2010, Mansfield was cast in Disney's local release of Toy Story 3 as the voice of Lifer.

In 2010, Mansfield hosted his own weekly finance show, Mansfield's Moneysense on CNBC Africa.

Mansfield presented Mansfield2day on the YouTube channel of the same name.

CDs and books
Mansfield had released five CDs containing characters he created on-air, humorous stories and songs (most of which he wrote himself) poking fun at many South African personalities and situations.

Mansfield wrote a number of joke books, of which Vrot Jokes is a South African bestseller. He co-authored multi award-winning contemporary cookbook titled Zhoozsh! in February 2009 with his wife, Jacqui. It won amongst other awards; Best Cook Book in South Africa and won Third Best Cook Book in the World at the Gourmand Awards.  Their second cookbook, Zhoozsh! Faking It is also an award-winner. Both books are best-sellers.

Death
He died on 31 October 2022, at the age of 59.

Awards and accolades

1985: AA Vita Award as The Most Promising Young South African Actor1996–2010: Best Radio Personality of the year (Best of Johannesburg Readers' Choice Awards) wins 14 years in a row

1996–2010: Best Radio Show wins 14 years in a row

2004: The only radio personality to make the Top 100 South Africans listWon Leisure Options' Most Popular Personality

2008: Three wins in the South African sector of the Gourmand Cookbook Awards: wins Book of the Year, Innovative and Media for 'Zhoozsh!'

2008: Zhoozsh! wins Bronze as Third Best Cookbook in the World at London ceremony on 13 April

2008: 'Zhoozsh!'wins Random House Struik Best Seller of the Year

2009: You magazine wins Radio Personality of the Year 2009

2011: Zhoozsh! Faking It wins South Africa's Easy Cook Book in the South African sector of the Gourmand Cookbook Awards

2019 Liberty Radio Awards: Community Radio category: wins Best Breakfast Show Presenter, Best Breakfast Show for "Mansfield in the Morning" and his show wins Best Content Producer

2020: He wins both Breakfast Show Presenter and Best Breakfast Show again.

Charity work

 The Christmas Wish: Mansfield established an annual charity drive aimed at assisting people around South Africa (Johannesburg primarily). Assistance included helping to pay school fees, covering people's financial expenses, paying for surgeries and hospital expenses and supplying homes. The Christmas Wish was broadcast live on The Rude Awakening and rebroadcast on M-Net in the evening of the same day.
 Hear for Life Trust: the Hear for Life Trust was established out of the Christmas Wish''. The trust was set up to assist in Cochlear implants to needy individuals who can not otherwise afford the procedures.
 He was a patron, along with Archbishop Emeritus Desmond Tutu, of The Sunflower Fund and an Ambassador of Hope for them
 He was an Honorary Member of the SA Chef's Association.
 Mansfield was an Honorary Member of the animal welfare group the NSPCA.
 Jeremy was also an ambassador for the Springbok Rugby Supporter's Club. 
 Recipient of the first SAB Inqaba Award (2010)

Mansfield was thanked personally by South Africa's former president Nelson Mandela for the charity work he had done which raised over R12 million.

References

1963 births
2022 deaths
People from Makhanda, Eastern Cape
South African people of British descent
South African male comedians
South African radio presenters
South African television presenters
White South African people
Deaths from liver cancer
Deaths from cancer in South Africa
Rhodes University alumni
Alumni of Kingswood College (South Africa)